Don Marcelino, officially the Municipality of Don Marcelino (Cebuano: Lungsod sa Don Marcelino; Filipino: Bayan ng Don Marcelino),  is a 3rd class municipality in the province of Davao Occidental, Philippines. According to the 2020 census, it has a population of 45,540 people.

It was created through Batas Pambansa Bilang 47 on December 19, 1979, from the municipality of Malita. It is named in honor of Marcelino Maruya, the first municipal mayor of Malita, appointed by President Manuel Quezon in 1936.

The municipality recently experience frequent tectonic earthquakes.  Television personality Franco Hernandez died at a drowning incident in Barangay North Lamidan on November 11, 2017. Police report that strong wave hit their motorized boat causing him and his girlfriend to fall off.

Geography

Climate

Barangays
Don Marcelino is politically subdivided into 15 barangays.

Demographics

Economy

Government
Municipal Officials 2022-2025:
 Mayor: Michael A. Maruya
 Vice Mayor: Doc Marnie Maruya
 Councilors:
 Renato Bautista
 Annie Blangket Sumalinog
 Joseph C. Betinol
 Reynold Llanto
 Amador Cano
 Jorge D. Gildore
 Peryong Cambalon
 Lito Caluyan
 Denestor Inantay
 Esmail Baning

References

External links
 Don Marcelino Profile at the DTI Cities and Municipalities Competitive Index
 [ Philippine Standard Geographic Code]
 Philippine Census Information
 Local Governance Performance Management System 

Municipalities of Davao Occidental